Top Camp is a locality in the Toowoomba Region, Queensland, Australia.

Geography 
It is immediately to the west of the Great Dividing Range and is at an elevation of .The highway passes through the eastern part of the locality from north (Kearney Springs) to south (Hodgson Vale).

The land use is rural residential.

History 
Top Camp State School opened on 17 June 1947 and closed on 13 June 1960.

Education 
There are no schools in Top Camp. The nearest primary schools are in Darling Heights, Drayton and Middle Ridge. The nearest secondary schools are in Harristown and Centenary Heights.

References

Further reading 

 

Suburbs of Toowoomba
Localities in Queensland